Gerard Mitchell was a senior Irish Catholic priest, a priest of the Archdiocese of Tuam and President of Maynooth College from 1959–1967.  Thereafter he became parish priest of Ballinrobe until his death in 1990.

Mitchell was appointed Professor of Dogmatic and Moral Theology at Maynooth in 1932, and served as Vice-President from 1958 until his appointment as president in 1959 following the death of Edward Kissane.

His time as President of the National Seminary was marked by the Second Vatican Council and an opening up the College to wider Irish life, including the introduction of lay i.e. non-seminarians to the College.  In 1966 he welcome veterans of the 1916 Easter Rising to the College.

References

1990 deaths
Presidents of St Patrick's College, Maynooth
20th-century Irish Roman Catholic priests
20th-century Irish educators